Apoaspilates is a genus of moths in the family Geometridae.

Species
 Apoaspilates tristrigaria (Bremer & Grey, 1853)

References
 Apoaspilates at Markku Savela's Lepidoptera and Some Other Life Forms

Gnophini
Geometridae genera